Events from the year 1994 in Pakistan.

Incumbents

Federal government
President: Farooq Leghari 
Prime Minister: Benazir Bhutto
Chief Justice: 
 until 14 April: Nasim Hasan Shah  
 15 April-4 June: Saad Saud Jan
 starting 5 June: Sajjad Ali Shah

Governors
Governor of Balochistan – Abdul Rahim Durrani (until 19 May); Imran Ullah Khan (starting 19 May)
Governor of Khyber Pakhtunkhwa – Amir Gulistan Janjua (until 26 March); Khurshid Ali Khan (starting 26 March)
Governor of Punjab – Iqbal Khan (until 26 March); Chaudhary Altaf Hussain (starting 26 March)
Governor of Sindh – Hakeem Saeed (until 23 January); Mahmoud Haroon (starting 23 January)

Events

Births
 January 01 - M Zunair Saeed, A famous Engineer and philanthropist
 January 17 – Sajal Ali, actress and model 
 October 15 – Babar Azam, cricketer

See also
1993 in Pakistan
Other events of 1994
1995 in Pakistan
Timeline of Pakistani history

References